The 1944–45 Primeira Divisão was the 11th season of top-tier football in Portugal.

Overview

It was contested by 10 teams, and S.L. Benfica won the championship.

League standings

Results

References

Primeira Liga seasons
1944–45 in Portuguese football
Portugal